Ouzel may refer to:
Common blackbird or ouzel, a species of thrush, all-black in the male
Lord Howe thrush or ouzel, an extinct subspecies of the island thrush
River Ouzel, a river in England, a tributary of the Great Ouse

See also
Ring ouzel, a species of thrush
White-throated dipper or water ouzel
American dipper or water ouzel
Ouzel Galley, an Irish merchant ship
"Iomramh an Ousel", a poem by Séamus Ó Néill
Woozle (disambiguation)

Animal common name disambiguation pages